The Arno XI is a hydroplane inspired by Achille Castoldi in the early 1950s and built by the Cantiere Timossi boatyard, located in Azzano (a frazione of Mezzegra) on the Lake Como. Castoldi wanted to establish a world water speed record so he persuaded then Ferrari racing drivers Alberto Ascari and Luigi Villoresi to influence Enzo Ferrari to supply him with a 4.5-litre, V12 Ferrari engine; the same engine that gave Ferrari his first Grand Prix victory with the Ferrari 375 F1 at Silverstone Circuit in 1951.
The engine was installed in a Timossi three-point racing hydroplane hull.

Engine modifications
Castoldi managed to further increase horsepower by attaching two superchargers. The result was a 502 bhp speedboat, which he used to hit a 150.19 mph top speed in October 1953 on Lake Iseo. This world speed record for an 800 kg boat still stands today.

Today
Arno XI was later sold and raced in numerous competitions, finally retiring in 1960. It has since been restored and is expected to go for up for sale by RM Auctions for up to €1.5m. In 2021 the Arno XI is for sale again at an asking price of USD$12 Million.

References 

Racing motorboats
Hydroplanes
Ferrari